The National Party (Spanish: Partido Nacional, PN) was a Chilean political party formed in 1966 by the union of the United Conservative Party, the Liberal Party and the National Action (founded in 1963 by Jorge Prat Echaurren, who had been Minister of Finances in 1954 in Carlos Ibáñez del Campo's cabinet).

It represented the right-wing of the Chilean political spectrum, against the centrist Christian Democratic Party and the leftist coalition Popular Unity. Its candidate Jorge Alessandri lost the 1970 presidential election. Three years later, in August 1973, after escalating political polarization, the Christian Democrats joined with the National Party in the same legislature against Allende. The following month, newly appointed chief of staff General Augusto Pinochet led the 1973 military coup against Allende, after which the National Party voluntarily dissolved itself on 21 September 1973.

The party supported the coup of 11 September 1973 and dissolved itself in the same year.

In March 1983 former members of the National Party and its supporters formed the Civic Action Committee in order to reconstruct a unified party of the right. This process was interrupted in October 1983 when group leaders Carmen Sáenz, Silvia Alessandri and Alicia Ruiz-Tagle de Ochagavía attempted to reconstruct the National Party proper. However, despite attempts to create a unified party of the right as existed before 1973, this was not possible. Thirteen backbench MPs joined the National Party, presided over by former Senator Patricio Phillips Peñafiel. However, 20 deputies and a large number of leaders and activists of yesteryear joined the National Union Movement, a party that four years later became the National Renewal (RN), while the people linked to the Gremialismo movement founded the Independent Democratic Union (UDI) and nationalist movements formed the MAN (National Action Movement) party that later became the National Advance. The PN participated in the creation of the Group of Eight, however, after poor electoral showings, it disbanded during the transition to democracy, in 1994.

Presidential candidates 
The following is a list of the presidential candidates supported by the National Party. (Information gathered from the Archive of Chilean Elections). 
1970: Jorge Alessandri (lost)
1988 plebiscite: "Yes" (lost)
1989: Francisco Javier Errázuriz (lost)
1993: Arturo Alessandri Besa (lost)

References

Political parties established in 1966
Political parties disestablished in 1994
Liberal conservative parties
Defunct political parties in Chile
1966 establishments in Chile
1994 disestablishments in Chile